Amane is a Japanese given name which can also be used as a surname. It is also an Ethiopian given name.

Possible writings
あまね (in hiragana)
アマネ (in katakana)
天音 "heavenly sound"
雨音 "The sound of the rain"
周     "everywhere"

People
Nishi Amane (西周, 1829–1897) Japanese philosopher
, Japanese voice actress and singer
Amane Gubena (born 1986) Ethiopian runner
, Japanese virtual YouTuber for Hololive Production
, Japanese actor

Fictional characters
With the given name Amane
Amane Amanohara (周), a character in tricksters
Amane Bakura (天音), a character in Yu-Gi-Oh!
Amane Kamori, a character in Her Majesty's Dog
Amane Kasai, a character in Delicious Party Pretty Cure
Amane Kaunaq (雨音), a character in Tenchi Muyo! GXP
Amane Kuzuryu, a character in Shin Megami Tensei: Devil Survivor
Amane Mochizuki, a character in If My Heart Had Wings
Amane Nishiki, a character in BlazBlue: Chronophantasma
Amane Ōtori (天音), a character in Strawberry Panic!
Amane Suou, a character in Grisaia no Kajitsu, Grisaia no Meikyuu, Grisaia no Rakuen
Amane Yugi, a character in the manga and anime "Jibaku Shounen Hanako-kun" or "Toilet-Bound Hanako-kun"
Amane Kusaba, one of the main characters from the anime Beyblade Burst Gachi. In the English Dub (Beyblade Burst Rise), he is re-named Arman Kusaba.
Amane (アマネ, Amane) is a female servant of the Zoldyck Family Hunter X Hunter
Amane Ubuyashiki from demon slayer
With the surname Amane
Kaoru Amane (雨音), a character in Taiyou no Uta
Misa Amane (弥), a character in Death Note
Suzuha Amane (阿万音 鈴羽), a character in Steins;Gate
Yūichirō Amane (天音 優一郎), a character in Seraph of the End. His adopted name is Hyakuya (百夜 - meaning "hundred nights"), after the orphanage he grew up in.

Other uses
Amane, Bhiwandi, a village in India

Japanese feminine given names
Japanese-language surnames
Japanese unisex given names